Great Sitkin Island is a volcanic island in the Andreanof Islands of  the Aleutian Islands of Alaska.

History

Great Sitkin was the site of a fuel depot during World War II, Sand Bay Naval Station, construction finished on May 15, 1943, and included accommodations for up to 680 men and consisted of 26 fuel oil tanks, three 6,000 barrel tanks, 22 10,000 barrel tanks and one 15,000 barrel tank and were surrounded by berms in case of attack or spills. The Naval Station had only around 10 people supporting it by 1949, but was in operation until 1963 and the remains of the oil tanks are still on the island and are an environmental hazard.  Starting in 2021, cleanup feasibility was investigated for the leftover contaminants from the base. On September 24, 1959, a Douglas DC-4 carrying 5 crew and 11 passengers crashed due to pilot error with no survivors. On October 26, 1965, Liberty Ship Ekaterini G. (formerly Josiah G. Holland) ran aground after losing her propeller in heavy seas. All crewmen were rescued, though 2 were injured and one, Sotiris Mendrinos, later died of his injuries.  The ship was declared a constructive total loss and remains aground on the western side of the island. On December 11, 1973, a Douglas DC-6 crashed on the island, killing all 10 people on board.

See also
List of mountain peaks of North America
List of mountain peaks of the United States
List of mountain peaks of Alaska
List of Ultras of the United States
List of volcanoes in the United States

References

External links

Andreanof Islands
Volcanoes of Alaska
Islands of Alaska
Islands of Unorganized Borough, Alaska
Landforms of Aleutians West Census Area, Alaska
Volcanoes of Unorganized Borough, Alaska